The Reisseck Railway (sometimes Reißeck Railway) is a mountain railway, that runs from Carinthia's Möll valley into the Reißeck Group, a small mountain range in southern Austria. It comprises the Reisseck Funicular and the Reisseck Mountain Railway (a narrow gauge railway).

General 

Further sections of line end at about 2,400 m. On the opposite side of the valley is another funicular, the Kreuzeck Railway. The lines are operated by Tauern Touristik.

Originally the railway was built to transport materiel to the dam and power station of the Reisseck-Kreuzeck power station. After various modifications and expansions its main function today is to provide passenger services.

The railway is closed in 2016 during construction work at Schoberboden.

Reisseck Funicular 

The Reisseck Funicular is a metre-gauge line and consists of 3 sections with a total length of around 3,500 metres. It climbs through 1,517 metres in height. The highest station is at 2,236 m by the Schoberboden. Next to the funicular is a pipe, 4,234.5 metres long, that carries water from the lakes of Großer Mühldorfer See, Kleiner Mühldorfer See, Hochalmsee and Radlsee into the Möll valley to the Reisseck-Kreuzeck storage reservoir.

Each section of the line is worked by coaches with 64 seats that are hauled by 40-millimetre-thick cables from their upper stations. The diameter of the electrically driven cable drums is 3.85 metres. The gradient of the line varies between 25 and 82%.

External links 

 Reisseck railways on the Verbund site
 Reisseck mountain railways
 Informationen auf der Village home page
 Photographs of the railway

Funicular railways in Austria
Metre gauge railways in Austria
Reisseck Group